Augustus Benton Chafin Jr. (May 18, 1960January 1, 2021) was an American politician who served in the Virginia House of Delegates from the 4th district in 2014, and in the Senate of Virginia from the 38th district from 2014 to 2021, as a member of the Republican Party.

Early life and education

Augustus Benton Chafin Jr. was born on May 18, 1960, in Abingdon, Virginia, to Augustus Benton Chafin Sr. and Mary Miller. He was married to Lora Lee Car for thirty-eight years and had three children with her. Chafin graduated from East Tennessee State University with a Bachelor of Arts in 1982, and later graduated from the University of Richmond School of Law with a juris doctor. His sister, Teresa M. Chafin, was elected to the Supreme Court of Virginia.

In 1986, Chafin created a law firm, Chafin Law Firm, in Lebanon, Virginia. He served as counsel for the Russell County Industrial Development Authority for eighteen years and served on the First Bank and Trust's board of directors, which his father has aided in the creation of.

Career

Virginia House of Delegates

During the 2013 Virginia House of Delegates election, Chafin sought a seat in the Virginia House of Delegates from the 4th district as a Republican. Incumbent Democratic Representative Joseph P. Johnson was retiring and Chafin faced no opposition in the general election.

Senate of Virginia

In 2013, Senator Phillip Puckett resigned from the Senate of Virginia causing a special election. Chafin defeated Democratic nominee Dean Michael Hymes and independent Rickey Allen Mullins in the special election becoming the first Republican elected to the 38th Senate district since George F. Barnes won during the 1971 election. Chafin and Hymes both raised over $700,000 for their campaigns. He was reelected in the 2015 and 2019 elections.

Chafin served on the Education and Health, Judiciary, Privileges and Elections, and Rehabilitation and Social Services committees in the state senate.

Death

Chafin was hospitalized after contracting COVID-19 in December 2020, and died from complications of COVID-19 at VCU Medical Center in Richmond, Virginia. A special election was called by Governor Ralph Northam to select a successor, which was won by Republican Travis Hackworth against Democratic nominee Laurie Buchwald.

Electoral history

References

External links
 
 Biography at Ballotpedia
 A. Benton Chafin, Jr. Republican, District 38, Senate of Virginia

1960 births
2021 deaths
20th-century American lawyers
21st-century American lawyers
21st-century American politicians
Deaths from the COVID-19 pandemic in Virginia
East Tennessee State University alumni
Republican Party members of the Virginia House of Delegates
People from Lebanon, Virginia
Politicians from Abingdon, Virginia
University of Richmond School of Law alumni
Virginia lawyers
Republican Party Virginia state senators